The Little Red Hen is a 2006 book by Jerry Pinkney of the classic folktale about a chicken and some animals that decline to assist her in the growing and harvesting of wheat which she then uses to bake bread. When the animals ask to have some, she refuses and instead eats the bread with her chicks.

Reception
The Horn Book Magazine, in a review of The Little Red Hen, wrote "Rhythmic text and color-coded type make this story about the rewards of cooperation perfect for reading aloud." and Booklist''' wrote " Perfect for reading aloud, this picture book will be a solid addition to the folklore shelves."The Little Red Hen has also been reviewed by Publishers Weekly, School Library Journal, Kirkus Reviews, Library Media Connection magazine, Common Sense Media, and The New York Times.

Awards
2006 New York Times'' 10 Best Illustrated Books of the Year
2007 ALA Notable Children's Book

References

2006 children's books
American picture books
Fictional chickens
Picture books by Jerry Pinkney
Dial Press books